Deinum is a railway station located in Deinum, Netherlands. The station was opened on 27 October 1863 and is located on the Harlingen–Nieuweschans railway between Harlingen and Leeuwarden. Train services are operated by Arriva.

OV Chipkaart 
Most public transit in the Netherlands makes use of the OV chipkaart, a national public transit card. The OV chipkaart is usable at this railway station.

Train services

Bus services

See also
 List of railway stations in Friesland

External links
NS website 
Dutch Public Transport journey planner 
Arriva website
OV Chipkaart website 

Railway stations in Friesland
Railway stations opened in 1863
Railway stations on the Staatslijn B
Waadhoeke